Mamadzhan Ismailov (27 July 1936 – 7 November 1993) was a Soviet equestrian. He competed in two events at the 1972 Summer Olympics.

References

External links
 

1936 births
1993 deaths
Soviet male equestrians
Olympic equestrians of the Soviet Union
Equestrians at the 1972 Summer Olympics
Sportspeople from Tashkent